Stratos (translit. To Mikro Psari - literally The Little Fish) is a 2014 Greek drama film directed by Yannis Economides. The film had its premiere in the competition section of the 64th Berlin International Film Festival.

Cast
 Vangelis Mourikis
 Vicky Papadopoulou
 Petros Zervos
 Yannis Tsortekis
 Giorgos Giannopoulos
 Yannis Anastasakis
 Veronica Naujoks

References

External links
 

2014 films
2014 drama films
Greek drama films
2010s Greek-language films